Dan Palmer (born 13 September 1988) is a former Australian professional rugby union player. He played for the Waratahs and Brumbies in Super Rugby, before a short stint with French club Grenoble. He also earned one cap for Australia in 2012. His usual position is tighthead prop.

Early life
Palmer was born in Shellharbour, New South Wales. He played junior rugby with Kiama and attended Warilla High School.  He represented Australia at Schoolboy, Under-19 and Under-20 levels. He played his senior club rugby in Sydney for Southern Districts in the Shute Shield.

Rugby career
In 2007, Palmer played for the Melbourne Rebels in the Australian Rugby Championship. He joined the New South Wales Waratahs squad in 2008 and was signed to a three-year deal after making his debut against the Highlanders in round three of the Super 14 competition. In 2011 he was looking for more playing time and moved to ACT to play for the Brumbies, where he became their starting tighthead prop.

Palmer was capped as the starting tighthead prop for Australia against Scotland in Newcastle on 5 June 2012. In January 2013, Palmer signed to play for FC Grenoble from the 2013–14 season.

However, he never played a match for Grenoble due to a persistent foot injury and subsequently announced his retirement from rugby union at the end of 2014. He returned to Australia to combine university studies with a scrum coaching role at the ACT Brumbies. Despite a drop in weight to below 16 stone, Palmer returned to the playing roster at the Brumbies as a short-term appointment at prop for team's tour to South Africa during the 2015 Super Rugby season.

Other
After rugby, Palmer returned to study and completed a double degree in science and psychology at the Australian National University. , Palmer is completing a PhD in the cellular mechanisms of brain function.

He is the first openly gay Wallabies player.

Reference list

External links
 
itsrugby.co.uk Profile

1988 births
Australian rugby union players
Australia international rugby union players
ACT Brumbies players
FC Grenoble players
Expatriate rugby union players in France
Gay sportsmen
LGBT rugby union players
Living people
New South Wales Waratahs players
Rugby union props
Australian LGBT sportspeople
21st-century LGBT people
Rugby union players from New South Wales